Michael Kalomiris (born 9 October 1986) is a Greek long distance runner who specialises in the marathon.

Kalomiris qualified for the 2016 Olympics due to his top-ten finish of eighth in the 2015 Rome Marathon, an IAAF Gold Label Road Race.  This was despite the fact that his time in that race was 10.5 minutes below the Olympic qualifying standard. He took a three-month leave of absence from his job as a lawyer to train for the Olympic marathon.

In the men's marathon event at the 2016 Summer Olympics he finished in 132nd place with a time of 2:37:03.

References

External links
 

1986 births
Living people
Greek male long-distance runners
Greek male marathon runners
Place of birth missing (living people)
Athletes (track and field) at the 2016 Summer Olympics
Olympic athletes of Greece
21st-century Greek people